The End of White Christian America is a 2016 American non-fiction book by Robert P. Jones, CEO of the Public Religion Research Institute.

Summary
The book looks at the political and cultural changes of an America that is no longer an evangelical majority white Christian nation.

Accolades
The End of White Christian America won the 2019 Grawemeyer Religion Award.

See also
 Religion in the United States
America's Original Sin-2015 book by Jim Wallis similar in content
 Donald Trump

References

External links
Simon & Schuster

Works about White Americans
Books about Christianity
Identity politics
Race in the United States
2016 non-fiction books
English-language books
Demography books
Simon & Schuster books